Paweł Januszewski (born January 2, 1972) is a retired hurdler from Poland, who is best known for winning the gold medal at the 1998 European Championships. A gold medalist at the 1999 Summer Universiade, he represented his native country in two consecutive Summer Olympics (1996 and 2000), reaching the final on the second occasion. In addition, he competed at four World Championships, qualifying for the final in 1999 and 2001.

Januszewski was born in Pyrzyce. He set his personal best (48.17s) in the men's 400 metres hurdles on August 20, 1998, in his winning race in Budapest, Hungary. It was the national record until 2007, when the mark was bettered by Marek Plawgo, and remains the second best result by a Polish athlete.

Competition record

References

1972 births
Living people
Polish male hurdlers
Athletes (track and field) at the 1996 Summer Olympics
Athletes (track and field) at the 2000 Summer Olympics
Olympic athletes of Poland
People from Pyrzyce
Skra Warszawa athletes
European Athletics Championships medalists
Sportspeople from West Pomeranian Voivodeship
Universiade medalists in athletics (track and field)
Goodwill Games medalists in athletics
Universiade gold medalists for Poland
Medalists at the 1999 Summer Universiade
Competitors at the 2001 Goodwill Games
20th-century Polish people
21st-century Polish people